Orlando Capellino Arenas (born on 17 April 1958), is a Uruguayan football coach, who was most recently manager of the Dominican Republic.

Managerial career 
In his native Uruguay, Capellino managed Deportivo Maldonado and Plaza Colonia.

In 2015, Capellino was appointed manager of Atlético Pantoja in the Dominican Republic. In Capellino's first season at the club, Atlético Pantoja won the 2015 Liga Dominicana de Fútbol.

In 2017, Capellino became manager of the Dominican Republic.

In 2022, he is currently the coach of the Colonia soccer team (department of Uruguay). Selection that will play the OFI national team tournament.

Managerial Statistics

References

1958 births
Living people
Uruguayan expatriate football managers
Dominican Republic national football team managers
Uruguayan football managers
Deportivo Maldonado managers
Club Plaza Colonia de Deportes managers